Dax Cars is a British sports car manufacturer founded in 1968 and based in North Weald, Essex, England.

Dax started as a fibreglass moulding company, named DJ Sportscars Int. and became first British company to make a kit based replica of the AC 427 Cobra.  On 15 August 2017, John Kox acquired the production of the Dax 427 from 427 Motor Company (formerly known as Dax Cars & DJ Sportscars Int.).

Tojeiro / 427
In 1975 John Tojeiro, the original designer of the AC Ace chassis became a director of the company and the car was renamed the Dax Tojeiro. The Tojeiro has undergone continuous development and  now called Dax 427. In 2003 the 427 De Dion became available, beside the 427 IRS, with a choice to accommodate most American V8 and Jaguar engines including the V12. Automatic or manual transmission can be used and power steering is another option. A leather trimmed interior kit.

Kamala
Launched in 1996 and designed by ex Ford designer Peter Walker, the Kamala was a radical looking original super car utilising the Cosworth 2 litre turbo engine giving a 0-60 time of 3.5 seconds..

Californian
Launched in 1985, the Californian was a Porsche 356 lookalike with VW Beetle components.

Nevada
The Nevada was an off-roader type vehicle using a space frame tubular chassis and VW Beetle engine announced in 1985.

Coupe
The Coupe made an appearance at the Stoneleigh show in 2018. While the Coupe is a new model, it’s based on the old underpinnings of the established Dax 427. The Dax Coupe  chassis is lengthened by 5in, that extra length being made from a new spaceframe section. Suspension is carried over and the engine options remain the same as on the 427.

References

Motor vehicle manufacturers of England
Sports car manufacturers
Kit car manufacturers
Companies based in Essex